Mario Alberto di Costanzo Armenta (born 14 March 1962) is a Mexican economist and politician from the Labor Party. From 2009 to 2012 he served as Deputy of the LXI Legislature of the Mexican Congress representing the Federal District.

References

1962 births
Living people
Politicians from Mexico City
Mexican economists
Instituto Tecnológico Autónomo de México alumni
Labor Party (Mexico) politicians
21st-century Mexican politicians
Deputies of the LXI Legislature of Mexico
Members of the Chamber of Deputies (Mexico) for Mexico City